The Mount Royal Station is a historic building in Baltimore, Maryland, which was the Baltimore and Ohio Railroad's third train station in Baltimore, Maryland, and is now part of the Maryland Institute College of Art (MICA) campus. The station was at the north end of the Baltimore Belt Line's Howard Street tunnel in the Bolton Hill neighborhood. It was the first railroad station in the world to have electrified passenger trains when it opened on September 1, 1896, serving the B&O's famed Royal Blue line.  Following its closure as a railroad station in 1961, it became part of the Maryland Institute College of Art, where it now houses the Middendorf Gallery, as well as studio and classroom space for the university's sculpture and fiber departments.

B&O history

Construction

Designed by Baltimore architect E. Francis Baldwin in a blend of modified Romanesque and Renaissance styling, the station was constructed in 1896 by the Baltimore and Ohio Railroad (B&O) as part of its massive Baltimore Belt Line improvement project for its New York passenger service. Located at the north end of the B&O's Howard Street tunnel, the station was built of Maryland granite trimmed with Indiana limestone, with a red tile roof and landmark  clocktower. The station's interior featured marble mosaic flooring, two fireplaces, and rocking chairs. It opened to the public on September 1, 1896. "It was considered," said the Baltimore Sun, "the most splendid station in the country built and used by only one railroad." That evaluation was shared by railroad historian Lucius Beebe, who proclaimed Mount Royal "one of the celebrated railroad stations of the world, ranking in renown with Euston Station, London, scene of so many of Sherlock Holmes' departures, the Gare du Nord in Paris, and the feudal fortress of the Pennsylvania Railroad at Broad Street, Philadelphia." A commentator for the Baltimore Evening Sun reminisced about the station years after it closed, writing that its waiting room ambiance was "like a mountain lodge after dinner", with cozy fireplaces ablaze at both ends of the station while passengers relaxed in rocking chairs serenaded by soothing recorded music.

Train operations

The B&O pioneered the first U.S. mainline railway electrification system at Mount Royal Station when it opened in 1896, installing an overhead third rail system in the station's trainshed and its tunnel approaches.

The most famous train associated with the Mount Royal Station was the Royal Blue, which ran between Washington, D.C. and New York City. Luminaries using the B&O's station over the years include U.S. Presidents Woodrow Wilson, Calvin Coolidge, Herbert Hoover, Franklin D. Roosevelt, and Dwight D. Eisenhower, along with Western showman "Buffalo Bill" Cody, singer Enrico Caruso, and celebrated conductor Arturo Toscanini, whose private Pullman car was parked on a siding during his appearances at the nearby Lyric Theatre. After the B&O ended all passenger service north of Baltimore on April 26, 1958, Mount Royal Station became the eastern terminus of B&O's passenger trains. It was one of thirteen Baltimore buildings selected in 1959 for the Historic American Buildings Survey. On June 30, 1961, the B&O consolidated its Baltimore passenger train service at Camden Station, permanently ending its use of Mount Royal Station after 65 years of operation.

Art studio conversion

The vacant railroad station building, train shed, and the surrounding 3¼ acres were acquired by the Maryland Institute College of Art (MICA) in 1964 for $250,000. The sale amount was far below market value and represented "a substantial donation on the part of the B&O", said MICA officials. After $1 million was raised by MICA for the project, the station was converted for use by art students in 1967 at a final cost of $18 per square foot of building space, which was considerably less than the estimated cost for a new building of $25 per square foot. The former B&O baggage room and platform areas were enclosed for use as studios and the station's exterior and clock tower were retained. This adaptive reuse preserved the Mount Royal Station as an example of late 19th century industrial architecture, using it for a purpose different from its original one. Design work for the conversion was performed by Richard Donkervoet of Cochran, Stephenson and Donkervoet. Donkervoet retained as much of the building's exterior appearance as possible, and also preserved much of the interior character, including the vaulted ceilings, columns, and mosaic floor. Architectural Forum recognized the station renovation for "sensitivity by later architects to the initial conception by the original," and Margaret Mead, in a lecture given at the station, commented that the renovation "is perhaps the most magnificent example in the Western World of something being made into something else".

On December 8, 1976, the station was added to the register of National Historic Landmarks, granting it full protection as an historic site. The Mount Royal Station's train shed, one of the country's last remaining such structures, was renovated in 1985 due to advanced deterioration of the shed's materials. In 1992, the AIA's Baltimore chapter honored the Maryland Institute and architects Cochran, Stevenson & Donkervoet with a 25 Year Award for Excellence in Design of Enduring Significance for their adaptive reuse of the former train depot.

Between 2005 and 2007, MICA accomplished a two-phased, $6.3 million renovation of the building by the architectural firm of Grieves, Worrall, Wright & O’Hatnick, Inc. The first phase, renovation of the interior, was completed in Fall, 2005: interior finishes, such as the mosaic tile flooring, marble columns, tin ceilings, wood wainscot, and trim were cleaned and restored. Classroom space was also increased, as well as the quality and quantity of studio space. The second phase, restoration of the building's exterior and train shed, was completed in Spring, 2007: stonework and wood were cleaned, repaired, and repainted, the slate canopy restored, and the drainage system fixed; clerestory and structural timbers in the train shed were replaced and the steel roof framing was reinforced. In keeping with the pedestrian landscaping and streetscape that MICA has created along Mount Royal Avenue, a new plaza with benches, bike racks, shrubs, and ornamental grasses and ground cover was added.

The Mount Royal Station building now houses the undergraduate departments of fiber and interdisciplinary sculpture, 3-D classrooms, and the Rinehart School of Sculpture, as well as senior studios. The historical address of the property was 1300 West Mount Royal Avenue, but the building's address is now 1400 Cathedral Street, as the former address is now used for the university campus at large.

See also

Baltimore Terminal Subdivision
Maryland Institute College of Art
Mount Clare Shops

References

External links

, including photo in 2004, at Maryland Historical Trust

Bolton Hill, Baltimore
Railway stations in the United States opened in 1896
Railway stations closed in 1961
Maryland Institute College of Art
National Historic Landmarks in Maryland
Railway stations on the National Register of Historic Places in Baltimore
Former Baltimore and Ohio Railroad stations
Clock towers in Maryland
Historic American Buildings Survey in Baltimore
Historic American Engineering Record in Baltimore
Railroad-related National Historic Landmarks
1896 establishments in Maryland
1961 disestablishments in Maryland
Railway stations in Baltimore
Former railway stations in Maryland
Baltimore City Landmarks